Rott may refer to:

Places
 Rott (Ammersee), a tributary of the Ammersee, in Bavaria, Germany
 Rott (Inn, Neuhaus am Inn), a tributary of the Inn at Neuhaus am Inn, in eastern Bavaria, Germany
 Rott (Inn, Rott am Inn) a tributary of the Inn at Rott am Inn, next to Großkarolinenfeld, in southern Bavaria, Germany
 Rott am Inn, a municipality in the district of Rosenheim, Bavaria, Germany
 Rott, a borough of the municipality Großkarolinenfeld, Bavaria, Germany
 Rott, Landsberg, a municipality in the district of Landsberg, Bavaria, Germany
 Rott, Rhineland-Palatinate, a municipality in Rhineland-Palatinate, Germany
 Rott, Bas-Rhin, a commune in Alsace, France
 Rott, a village in the municipality of Vaals, the Netherlands
 Rott Abbey, in Rott am Inn

Abbreviations
 Rise of the Triad, a 1994 video game
 Rise of the Triad (2013 video game)
 Rott, nickname for the Rottweiler dog breed
 Realm of the Titans

People with the surname
 Ferenc Rott (born 1970), Hungarian football player
 Hans Rott (1858–1884), Austrian composer
 Ladislav Rott (1851–1906), Czech, son of Vincenc Josef Rott, the founder of the V. J. Rott company
 Oldřich Rott (born 1951), Czech footballer
 Vladimir Rott, (born 1935) Canadian engineer turned author
 Wolfgang Rott (born 1946), German field hockey player
 Yannick Rott (born 1974), French football player

See also
 Rott Formation, a geologic formation in Germany
 Rotte (disambiguation)

German-language surnames